Giorgio Fuentes (1756–1821) was a painter and stage designer of the Neoclassic period. He was born in Milan, studied under Pietro Gonzaga, and distinguished himself as a painter of decorations in La Scala at Milan, the stage at Frankfurt (1796–1805), and for the Grand Opera in Paris. He died in Milan in 1821.

References

18th-century Italian painters
Italian male painters
19th-century Italian painters
19th-century Italian male artists
Painters from Milan
Italian scenic designers
Italian neoclassical painters
1756 births
1821 deaths
Theatre people from Milan
18th-century Italian male artists